The Olympus Zuiko Digital ED 9–18mm 1:4.0-5.6  is a Four Thirds System lens.

References

External links
 Official Webpage
 Review on dpreview.com
 

009-018mm F4-5.6